A leadership election was held by the Malaysian Chinese Association (MCA) on 4 November 2018.

Both Wee Ka Siong and his running mate Mah Hang Soon won the presidency and deputy presidency respectively.

Central Committee election results

President

Deputy President

Vice Presidents

Central Working Committee Members

References

2018 elections in Malaysia
Malaysian Chinese Association leadership election
Malaysian Chinese Association leadership elections